Fryatt is a surname. Notable people with the surname include:

Charles Fryatt (1872–1916), British mariner executed in WWI
Frances Elizabeth Fryatt (?–?), American author, editor, specialist in household applied arts
Jim Fryatt (born 1940), English footballer
Matty Fryatt (born 1986), English footballer